Steve Bond (born April 22, 1953) is an Israeli-American television actor and model.

Biography 
Shlomo Goldberg (later Steve Bond) was born in Haifa, Israel to a Romania-born mother and a Hungary-born father who immigrated to Israel. He married in 1982 to his wife Cindy, and had a daughter, Ashlee Bond, now an American-Israeli Olympic show jumping rider who competes for Israel.

Media career
He was a child actor who starred in Tarzan and the Jungle Boy, a 1968 release. In 1975, Bond appeared nude for a photo-spread published in the October issue of Playgirl magazine. He moved to the U.S. in the early 1980s. He became a daytime television actor on General Hospital, playing Jimmy Lee Holt from 1983 to 1987. In 1984, Bond posed bare-chested for a pin-up wall poster. In the early 1980s, he worked as male stripper for Chippendales and appeared in one of the calendars. As a Chippendale dancer, he appeared on the 1982 show The Shape of Things.

His early film credits included roles in Massacre at Central High (1976), H.O.T.S. (1979), Gas Pump Girls (1979), Witches' Brew (1980) and The Prey (1983). 

In 1989, he joined the cast of daytime drama Santa Barbara as Mack Blake where he stayed for one year. Later, he starred as a seductive, evil vampire in the movies To Die For (1989) and Son of Darkness: To Die For II (1991).

1988 marked the year of Bond's breakthrough into move roles as Travis Abilene in Picasso Trigger.

References

Further reading
 Holmstrom, John. The Moving Picture Boy: An International Encyclopaedia from 1895 to 1995. Norwich, Michael Russell, 1996, p. 298-299.

External links 
 
 

1953 births
American male child actors
American male film actors
American male models
American male soap opera actors
Israeli emigrants to the United States
Israeli Jews
Israeli male child actors
Israeli male film actors
Israeli male models
Israeli people of Hungarian-Jewish descent
Israeli people of Romanian-Jewish descent
Jewish male models
Living people
Models from Haifa
Playgirl Men of the Month